Cartier Wind Energy (French: Cartier Énergie éolienne) is a developer, owner and operator of wind farms in Quebec. Formed in 2004 as a partnership between TransCanada Corporation (62%) and Innergex Renewable Energy (38%), the Longueuil-based company has built 5 wind farms with a combined capacity of 589.5 MW in the Gaspé peninsula delivering power under a 20-year contract signed in 2005 with Hydro-Québec. The company's sixth project, a 150-MW wind farm in Les Méchins, Quebec, was cancelled in 2010, after Cartier failed to reach an agreement with landowners.

Facilities

References

External links
 

Renewable energy companies of Canada
Electric power companies of Canada
Companies based in Longueuil
Energy companies established in 2004
Renewable resource companies established in 2004
2004 establishments in Quebec
Joint ventures
TC Energy
Wind power in Canada